Daan Myngheer (13 April 1993 – 28 March 2016) was a Belgian cyclist. He died in a hospital two days after suffering a heart attack during the first stage of the 2016 Critérium International.

Major results

2011
 1st  Road race, National Junior Road Championships
 1st Omloop Mandel-Leie-Schelde Juniors
2013
 1st Road race, West Flanders Under-23 Road Championships
 1st  Overall Ronde van Oost-Vlaanderen
1st Stage 2
 1st Brussels–Zepperen
 10th Rund um den Finanzplatz Eschborn-Frankfurt U23
2014
 1st Stage 3 (TTT) Essor Breton
 5th Kattekoers
 5th Rund um den Finanzplatz Eschborn-Frankfurt U23
2015
 4th Grand Prix Criquielion
 7th Omloop Het Nieuwsblad U23
 9th Ster van Zwolle

See also
 List of professional cyclists who died during a race

References

1993 births
2016 deaths
Belgian male cyclists
Cyclists who died while racing
Sport deaths in France
People from Roeselare
Cyclists from West Flanders
21st-century Belgian people